The Pretending Lovers is a 2011 Chinese romantic comedy film co-written and directed by Liu Fendou. It stars Jiang Yiyan as Shen Lu and Huang Bo as her fake boyfriend. The rest of the cast includes Zhang Mo, Xia Jiawei, Wang Yansu, Li Haibin, Zhang Yuhan, and Gao Yifei. The film premiered in China on June 24, 2011. It tells a love story between a insurance salesman and a suspiciously psycho girl.

Plot
Shen Lu (Jiang Yiyan) is a suspiciously psycho girl. And Chen Wen (Huang Bo) is a insurance salesman. One day, when they meet in a square, Shen invites him to pretend as her boyfriend and Chen agreed because he is single for long. Every day, Chen goes to the hospital to see Shen and plays games with her. After a considerable period of time, Chen falls in love with Shen. But one day, Shen suddenly lost the news and disappeared. When they meet again, Shen put forward to end this game of pretending lovers.

Cast
 Huang Bo as Chen Wen, a salesman of an insurance company.
 Jiang Yiyan as Shen Lu, a suspiciously psycho girl.
 Zhang Mo as the roommate
 Xia Jiawei as the boss
 Wang Yansu as the nurse
 Li Haibin as the doctor
 Zhang Yuhan as colleague
 Gao Yifei as colleague

Soundtrack

Release
The Pretending Lovers was released on June 24, 2011 in China.

Reception
Douban gave the film 6.0 out of 10.

References

External links
 
 
 

2011 films
Chinese romantic comedy films
2010s Mandarin-language films